Marvel UK is a British comic publishing company. It started life as an imprint of Marvel Comics before being bought by Panini Comics in the mid-1990s. The titles include a mix or original stories as well as reprints from Marvel Comics' comic books.

Titles

A
 The A-team Summer Special
 Abslom Daak - Dalek Killer
 Acorn Green
 Action Force
 Action Force Monthly
 Action Man
 The Adventures of the Galaxy Rangers
 Amazing X-Men
 Astonishing Spider-Man
 Avengers Unconquered
 Avengers United

B
 Battletide
 Battletide II
 Beavis & Butt-head
 Biker Mice From Mars
 Black Axe
 Blake's 7
 Blockbuster
 Bloodseed
 Body Count (comics)

C
 Captain America
 Captain Britain Weekly
 Children of the Voyager
 The Complete Spider-Man
 Cyberspace 3000

D
 Dances With Demons
 Daredevil & Captain America: Dead On Arrival
 The Daredevils
 Dark Angel
 Dark Guard
 Death Metal
 Death Wreck
 Death's Head
 Die Cut
 Die Cut vs. G-Force
 Digitek
 Doctor Who Magazine
 Dracula Lives
 Dragon's Claws

E
 Essential X-Men
 The Exploits of Spider-Man

F
 Fantastic Four Adventures
 Frantic Magazine

G
 Gene Dogs
 Genetix
 Glam Metal Detectives
 Gun Runner

H
 Hell's Angel
 Hulk Comic

I
 The Incredible Hulks
 Indiana Jones
 Inspector Gadget

K
 Killpower: The Early Years King Arthur and the Knights of Justice Knights of PendragonM
 Marvel Action Marvel Bumper Comic Marvel Heroes Marvel Heroes Reborn Marvel Legends Marvel Rampage Marvel Super Adventure The Mighty Thor (1983) The Mighty World of Marvel Mortigan Goth: Immortalis Motormouth Motormouth & Killpower
 Mys-Tech Wars

N
 Night Raven: House of Cards

O
 The Original X-Men
 Overkill

P
 Planet of the Apes
 Plasmer

R
 The Real Ghostbusters
 Ren & Stimpy
 Rugrats
 Rupert and Friends
 Rupert Weekly

S
 Savage Sword of Conan
 Shadow Riders
 Spectacular Spider-Man Adventures
 Spider-Man Comics Weekly
 Star Wars Weekly
 Starburst
 Super Spider-Man and Captain Britain
 Super Soldiers

T
 Target: 2006
 Thor and the X-Men
 ThunderCats
 Tiny Toon Adventures
 Tom and Jerry
 Top Cat
 The Transformers

U
 Ultimate Spider-Man
 The Union

W
 Warheads
 Warheads: Black Dawn
 Wild Thing
 Wolverine and Deadpool
 Wolverine: Saudade

Z
 Zoids

References

External links

Panini Comics titles list

Marvel UK
Marvel UK